Diego López Fuentes (born 9 December 1997) is a Spanish cyclist, who currently rides for UCI ProTeam .

References

External links

1997 births
Living people
Spanish male cyclists
Cyclists from Navarre
People from Estella Oriental